The women's quadruple sculls competition at the 1976 Summer Olympics took place at Notre Dame Island Olympic Basin, Canada. It was the first time the event was contested for women.

Competition format

The competition consisted of two main rounds (heats and finals) as well as a repechage. The 9 boats were divided into two heats for the first round, with 5 boats in one heat and 4 boats in the other. The winner of each heat advanced directly to the "A" final (1st through 6th place). The remaining 7 boats were placed in the repechage. Two heats were held in the repechage, with 4 boats in one heat and 3 boats in the other. The top two boats in each heat of the repechage went to the "A" final as well. The remaining 3 boats (3rd and 4th placers in the repechage heats) competed in the "B" final for 7th through 9th place.

All races were over a 1000 metre course. The 1976 event (along with the 1980 and 1984 competitions) featured a coxswain in each boat; later editions dropped the coxswain.

Results

Heats

Heat 1

Heat 2

Repechage

Repechage heat 1

Repechage heat 2

Finals

Final B

Final A

Final classification

References

Rowing at the 1976 Summer Olympics
Women's rowing at the 1976 Summer Olympics